"Queen of the Troubled Teens" is the debut single by Idlewild, released on Human Condition in March 1997. Initially, the single received only small scale acknowledgement in Edinburgh's record shops, and later received praise from local students and BBC Radio 1's Steve Lamacq.

This single is the only release to feature original bassist Phil Scanlon.

Queen of the Troubled Teens, can be downloaded for free (along with second single, "Chandelier") by fans who enter the CD version of Scottish Fiction - Best of 1997-2007 into their computer.

During an interview in 2007, Roddy Woomble mentioned that he had: "one copy of ‘Queen Of The Troubled Teens’, but the thing is that it’s rubbish. I mean, for what it is – when I look back, like I do with fondness at copies of a favourite book or something – musically it’s just a bunch of 19-year-olds. Of course it’s part of the band’s history, but I think things have moved on.”

The song has appeared on recent setlists, and remains a fan-favourite.

Track listing
"Queen of the Troubled Teens"
"Faster"
"Self Healer" (Original version)

References

1997 singles
Idlewild (band) songs
1997 songs
Songs written by Bob Fairfoull
Songs written by Colin Newton
Songs written by Rod Jones (musician)
Songs written by Roddy Woomble